Zinc transporter ZIP3 is a protein that in humans is encoded by the SLC39A3 gene.

See also 
 Solute carrier family

References

Further reading 

 
 
 
 
 
 

Solute carrier family